Transducin-like enhancer protein 1 is a protein that in humans is encoded by the TLE1 gene.

Interactions 

TLE1 has been shown to interact with:

 Glycoprotein 130, 
 HES6, 
 RUNX1,
 RUNX3, 
 SIX3 
 TLE2,  and
 UTY.

References

Further reading